Dale is a ghost town in section 34 of Highland Grove Township in Clay County, Minnesota, United States.

History
The village of Dale was established by Andrew L. Jelsing when he purchased and moved Ole Gol's saloon from Winnipeg Junction.  In addition to owning the saloon, Jelsing was also proprietor of a general store, postmaster, and depot agent at the town's rail station.  At one time the village had a town hall, a jail, an elevator, and numerous private homes.  The post office closed in 1971.

Notes

Former populated places in Minnesota
Former populated places in Clay County, Minnesota